Novosyolovo or Novoselovo is the name of several rural localities in Russia:
Novosyolovo, Krasnoyarsk Krai, a selo in Novosyolovsky District of Krasnoyarsk Krai
Novosyolovo, Kirzhachsky District, Vladimir Oblast, the place of Yuri Gargarin's death
Novosyolovo, Nizhny Novgorod Oblast, a village in Sharangsky District of Nizhny Novgorod Oblast